Bida Setar (also Romanized as Bīdā Setar; also known as Bīd Setar) is a village in Taftan-e Jonubi Rural District, Nukabad District, Khash County, Sistan and Baluchestan Province, Iran. At the 2006 census, its population was 283, in 53 families.

References 

Populated places in Khash County